Scion is a series of role-playing games published by White Wolf, Inc and Onyx Path Publishing.  The first core rule book, Scion: Hero. was released on April 13, 2007.  The second volume, Scion: Demigod, was released on September 12, 2007, and the third, Scion: God, was released on January 23, 2008. The Scion Companion began release in sections March 2008, as a PDF direct download. Scion: Ragnarok was released on January 21, 2009.  A second edition was announced in August 2012, changing the setting and also updating the system from the previous Storytelling System to the new Storypath system. This second edition was released for public purchase on June 5, 2019.

Setting 
Scion is a role-playing game wherein players take on the roles of mortal descendants of gods tasked with working as the hands of their parents in the mortal world; while the first edition focused on a singular antagonist in the form of the recently escaped Titans (powerful, primordial embodiments of concepts such as water, chaos or light), the second edition does not automatically place this at the forefront.  

The pantheons presented draw from mythology across the world, giving players the ability to associate their characters with any of the pantheons presented in the game.  Portrayals of the gods differ between editions, ranging from a minor renaming (e.g. the Greek Gods no longer being listed as the "Dodekatheoi" but as simply the "Theoi") to full-fledged reimagining (The African Loa of first edition are now initially presented in their pre-syncretic forms as the Yoruban Orisha before a later book explores their previous portrayal).

Differences between editions 

Scion changed drastically between its first and second editions.  While the first edition presented an Earth effectively identical to the real one, the second presented instead a setting literally referred to as "The World," wherein Abrahamic faiths did not so completely overtake Europe, let alone the rest of the world. As such, while The World is much like the real world on a surface level, other pantheons are still widely recognized and worshiped throughout.  Further, the existence of gods and other supernatural entities is presented as generally acknowledged as fact rather than faith, although rarely present in anyone's day-to-day life.

With the updated Storypath system, the mechanism of advancement has changed; Scion players create Deeds as goals for their characters to experience or accomplish, and through these gain a large portion of Experience Points.  While Legend continues to be the most significant measure of a Scion's growing power, and still measures the thresholds past which a Hero becomes a Demigod, and then a full-fledged deity, it is no longer increased by the expenditure of experience points but directly by the accomplishment of deeds. 

The nature of demigod-hood has significantly altered: while previously it was a relatively natural progression of power that had few survivors merely owing to increasing scope of danger in a growing war against the Titans, the second edition plays up the liminal state of Demigods by making it explicitly temporary: A scion who has moved beyond being a "mere" Hero finds herself on the road to apotheosis, passing through a series of trials and constructing a larger-than-life mythic identity called a Mantle in the process.  While Heroes can theoretically return from death, a Demigod who passes a certain point of advancement can no longer do so; should they die, it becomes the natural terminus of their story.  As such, some mortal cultural heroes are demigods, in-setting, whose deaths and failures marked where their own pursuit of godhood failed.  Those people, however, left behind their Mantles, and a hero who wishes to do so may pick up an incomplete Mantle and try to complete it, succeeding where their predecessor failed, overwriting their death with the new hero's own triumph, and becoming the deity that the initial hero wanted to be.  A scion may also, at the point of apotheosis, try to take the identity of an existing god, either by wresting it from them, accepting a lesser mantle from that god, or by surrendering their identity, effectively declaring that they were always an incarnation of that deity.

The options of player characters has also greatly diversified, with more human options such as prophets, sorcerers, and saints, as well as supernatural entities such as Kitsune, Satyrs, and skin-changing Therianthropes, who may or may not claim patronage or descent from a higher power.  Even the Scions themselves have become more diverse: instead of being universally blood descendants of the gods, they may now include those who have been chosen by the god (gaining their favor either by an affinity of fate or a special bloodline), created whole cloth, or even an Incarnate Scion: a mortal guise of a deceased god in the world.

The nature of the relationship between the world, the Gods, and Fate has altered: as the Gods create myths of themselves, they alter the world not just going forward, but retroactively: a newly ascended god may find herself in her pantheon's prayers and traditions going back centuries before her birth.  Such myths can birth new facets of a deity; many gods have developed multiple Mantles over time.  This process gave rise, in-setting, to the Loa from the Orisha, and likewise covers the correspondence between the Greek and Roman gods.

Furthermore, while the Titans still exist, the degree to which they are presented as antagonistic varies: while the Greek Theoi regard them largely as dangerous foes who must be opposed, the Shen of China are more inclined to try to incorporate them into their hierarchy and give them a job and purpose within the Celestial Bureaucracy, and the Orisha explicitly regard the difference as a political designation for enemies, rather than a term possessing any material or metaphysical distinction. The game explicitly intends for the presentation and relevance of antagonistic titans to be to adjustable to a given group's tastes.

In the Second Edition book Titanomachy, the titans and their relationship to the gods is given a spotlight.  While the previous edition allowed the Titans to "adopt" a willing scion of a god as one of their own, they may now create progeny directly in the same ways that the gods may, who can join the ranks of their parents just like the progeny of the divine can; this allows fallen titans (such as Ymir) to return, while the multiple facets of the gods reflected in their Mantles means that some can exist as both God and Titan.

The writing team has also expressed the intention to introduce a new faction to the game by way of dragons, who are here presented as pre-human entities whose reign was brought to an end by the ascendance of the gods and humanity. Dragons are greatly focused on memory: immune to the rewriting of history that the gods do, they remember all pasts that were, and even slain dragons still exist in a communal pool of memories. They exist in hiding, grouped into Flights (based both on philosophy and geography) and work through Heirs—humans who have been bestowed a fragment of a Dragon's might, analogous to divine Scions—who can ultimately embrace that power, shed their humanity, and join the ranks of their patron.  Deceased dragons can even return again, if an heir decides to become that dragon upon their final ascension.

System 

Scion uses a rules system similar to the Storyteller system made popular by the World of Darkness, but is not part of that setting. While the first edition of Scion modified the core system of Exalted: Second Edition, the new edition has a new core system related to it, but with an explicit design goal of being able to handle the entire range of the game (from mundane mortal humans all the way to full-fledged divinity) without breaking down. For more information, refer to the Storypath System section of the Storyteller system page.

Books 
Scion: Hero
Scion: Demigod
Scion: God
Scion Companion
Scion: Ragnarök
Scion: Yazata: The Persian Gods
Scion: Liberty Road (PDF only)
Scion: Seeds of Tomorrow (PDF only)
Scion: Wolfsheim (PDF only)
Scion: Écran du Conteur (France only)
Scion: Extras: Supplemental (Yet Can Be Somewhat Useful On Occasion) Scions
Scion: Origin
Scion: Hero (2nd Edition)
Scion: Demigod (2nd Edition)
Mythical Denizens
Scion: Car Competition
So Now You're a Hero
Zeus!  We Just Wanna Talk!
Scion Companion: Mysteries of the World
Scion Player's Guide: Saints and Monsters
Titanomachy
Storypath Tasty Bit: Making History Modern
Heroes for the World: (Ready-Made Characters for Scion Second Edition)
A Light Extinguished (A Jumpstart for Scion Second Edition)
Scion: Annie X
Scion: Dragon
Masks of the Mythos
Scion: Wild Hunt(Announced)
Scion: Path to Apotheosis(Announced)
Scion: No Gods, No Masters(Announced)
Scion: God (2nd Edition)(Announced)
Scion: Dragon Jumpstart(Announced)
Scion: Realms of Magic and Mystery(Announced)
Scion: Once and Future(Announced)

References

External links 
 Onyx Path's Scion product page
 Onyx Path's official Scion Forums

White Wolf Publishing games
Fantasy role-playing games
Contemporary role-playing games
Role-playing games introduced in 2007
Games based on myths and legends
Ymir